Kyle Evan Rea (born September 4, 1981) is an American actor, voice-actor, filmmaker and producer, known for his voice-over roles in Fist of the North Star, Ultraman, Gaiking, Dangard Ace, and Space Pirate Captain Harlock. He’s acted in over 20 films, voice-acted in over 35 anime, live action and motion comic titles.

Kyle is a multi-award winning photographer, screenwriter and producer.

Early life and education
Kyle Evan Rea was born in Warrenton, Oregon then moved to the farm town of Brownsmead, Oregon in the Pacific Northwest. 
In 2002, Rea began training with Gloria Manon in Portland Oregon. There he learned the fundamental approach to acting and voice-over.

Career
Rea took initial acting classes under the guidance of Amy Lyndon. 
In 2006, Rea won finalist recognition in the WILDsound screenplay competition for his screenplay “The Last One”. 
In 2007, he founded Clockwork Mind Pictures, a genre production company in Los Angeles, California. Current titles under the company’s belt include Good Day L.A., Egg in a Shell, Tiger Play, Billy Boy: Clown of Many Mysteries, and The Hollywood Devil, and Blood Redd which was a ShockerFest winner.

In 2009, Rea was cast in his first major voice-over role for the American dub of a Fist of the North Star anime titles by Toei Animation which was produced and directed by William Winckler Productions. Following these breakout voice-over roles, Rea was cast as several lead characters in other American dub anime films such as GeGeGe no Kitarō, Space Pirate Captain Harlock, Dangard Ace, The Adventures of Nadja, Gaiking and Starzinger.

Rea also voiced roles for the motion comic titles Karasuma Kyoko no Jikenbo and The Mythical Detective Loki. In 2017, Rea was in Japanese live action features Ultraman Zero: The Revenge of Belial for which he voiced Belial and Ultra Fight Victory for which he voiced Yapool. He also dubbed Ultraman 80 in Mega Monster Battle: Ultra Galaxy.

Filmography

Animation

References

External links
Kyle Rea on Anime News Network.
Kyle Rea on IMDb.

American male voice actors
1981 births
Male actors from Oregon
People from Warrenton, Oregon
Living people